Echten is a small village in De Fryske Marren in the province of Friesland, the Netherlands. It had a population of around 235 in 2017.

History 
The village was first mentioned in 1245 as Acthne. The etymology is unclear, however forest of oak trees fits the earliest forms. Echten is a road village along the Heerenveen-Lemmer main road. In the 18th century, peat excavation started and finished in the middle of the 19th century. The Protestant Church dates from the middle of the 13th century, and received its current form in the late 17th century. In 1825, the village was flooded and most of the houses were either destroyed or severely damaged. In 1840, Echten was home to 894 people.

The  Veenpolder was poldered between 1856 and 1871. It needed 7 wind mills to pump away the excess water. In 1913, a steam engine-powered pumping station was built. In 1925, it was converted to an electric engine, and the chimney was demolished. The pumping station was decommissioned in 1996. In 2006-2007, it was restored and the chimney was rebuilt. It is currently used an exhibition and gallery space.

Gallery

References

External links

De Fryske Marren
Populated places in Friesland